Mid Sweden University (Mittuniversitetet) is a Swedish state university located in the region around the geographical center of Sweden, with two campuses in the cities of Östersund and Sundsvall. The university closed a third campus in Härnösand in the summer of 2016.

History
Created on 1 July 1993, the institution was originally called Mid Sweden University College (Mitthögskolan) and was the result of a merger between the University College of Sundsvall/Härnösand (Högskolan i Sundsvall/Härnösand) and the University College of Östersund (Högskolan i Östersund). The two university colleges had been founded in 1977, with roots in the School of social work that started in 1971 in the city of Östersund, and in the Folk high school teachers' seminary and the nautical training/naval school that were launched in 1842 in the city of Härnösand. On 1 July 1995, the Sundsvall/Örnsköldsvik and Östersund Colleges of Health Sciences (Vårdhögskolor) were also incorporated.

In 2001 Mid Sweden University was awarded university status in the natural sciences area of research including IT, and was thus entitled to issue doctoral degrees. Employees that were carrying out doctoral studies before then were enrolled at other universities, where they had their main supervisor, but also locally supervised at Mid Sweden University College. Effective 1 January 2005, the government of Sweden granted the institution the right to call itself a university and the school's name changed to Mid Sweden University (Mittuniversitetet).

Organization
Mid Sweden University has two authorised areas of research (vetenskapsområden), organized under the Faculty of Science, Technology and Media (since 2001), and the Faculty of Human Sciences (since 2005) respectively. Education and research is also organized under the Faculty of Educational Sciences (lärarutbildningsnämnden).

The university was organized into eight departments, of which four are multi-campus departments:

Faculty of Human Sciences:
Department of Humanities
Department of Social Sciences
Department of Social Work
Department of Health Sciences
Department of Economics, Geography, Law and Tourism 
Faculty of Science, Technology and Media:
Department of Information Technology and Media
Department of Natural Sciences
Department of Engineering, Physics and Mathematics
Faculty of Educational Sciences:
Department of Education

Education
The university has offered bachelor's degree (kandidatexamen) and Swedish master's degree (magisterexamen, one year) in a wide range of subjects since 1994, doctoral degree (doktorsexamen and licentiatexamen) since 2001, and International master's degree (masterexamen, two years) according to the Bologna model since 2005. Mid Sweden University also offers professional degrees within Master of Science and Engineering (civilingenjörsexamen, similar to German Diploma engineer) since 2003, and as engineer, teacher, nurse, specialist nurse, social worker/welfare officer (socionom), journalist and, from 2008, Psychologist.

The university's two main campuses have different focuses but with some overlap. The Sundsvall campus has a school of education and offers various courses in the humanities and arts. It also has a wide range of courses and degrees in the technical and natural sciences and journalism. The Östersund campus focuses on graduate degrees in tourism, health care, social work and public administration. Campus Östersund also has Sweden's only ecotechnology programme. Besides the above, education and research within digital printing technology is located to the city of Örnsköldsvik.

The institution is also well known for a wide range of web-based distance education.

Number of students and employees
In school year 2009/2010, the university had 21,476 undergraduate students (including master students) with 4,000 of them based in Östersund, 4,000 in Sundsvall, 2,000 in Härnösand and the rest are learning on distance. The university has 235 doctoral students, about 800 teachers, of which 80 were employed professors, and totally more than 1000 employees.

Past rectors (Sundsvall) 
1993–1994 Alf Gunnmo
1994–1999 Kari Marklund
1999 (acting) Alf Gunnmo
1999–2003 Gunnar Svedberg
2003 (acting) Pia Sandvik Wiklund
2003–2008 Thomas Lindstein
2008 (acting) Håkan Wiklund
2008-2016 Anders Söderholm

Past prorectors (Östersund) 
1993–1999 Alf Gunnmo
1999 (acting) Sture Pettersson
1999–2002 Mats Ericson
2002–2005 Pia Sandvik Wiklund
2003 (acting) Sture Pettersson
2005–2006 (acting) Sture Pettersson
2006— Håkan Wiklund
2008 (acting) Sture Pettersson

Honorary doctorates at Mid Sweden University
2001 – Thorbjörn Fälldin
2002 – Kenway Smith
2004 – Sverker Martin-Löf
2006 – Bodil Malmsten and Bengt Saltin
2008 – Magdalena Forsberg and Lars Näsman
2010 – Kenneth Eriksson, Erik Fichtelius, Björn Fjæstad and Jan Stenberg

Famous alumni
Here is a list of people who have received attention from national media, and have studied either at Mid Sweden University, or one of the colleges that later formed Mid Sweden University.

Jerry Ahrlin, cross-country skier
Abir Al-Sahlani, Member of Parliament
Berit Andnor, former Minister for Social Affairs and member of parliament
Helena Jonsson, biathlete
Mari Jungstedt, journalist and author
Jan Helin, journalist and the editor-in-chief of Aftonbladet since 2008
Anna-Karin Kammerling, swimmer
Mikaela Laurén, swimmer and boxer
Melodie MC (Kent Lövgren), Eurodance rapper
Ylva Nowén, Alpine skier and expert commentator
Linda Olofsson, TV journalist
Anna Ottosson, Alpine skier
Roger Haddad, Member of Parliament
Fadime Sahindal
Anders Sodergren, cross-country skier
Åsa Torstensson, Member of Parliament and former Minister for Transport 2006–2010
Fredrik Wikingsson, journalist and TV host
Gina Dirawi, comedian and TV host

See also

List of colleges and universities in Sweden
Student Union in Sundsvall

References

External links

Mid Sweden University – Official site
Courses for exchange students – Courses taught in English
Study programmes taught in English – International programmes
Mid Sweden University Students' Union (Östersund)  – Official site
Mid Sweden University Students' Union (Sundsvall)  – Official site

 
Härnösand
Östersund
Educational institutions established in 1993
Buildings and structures in Jämtland County
1993 establishments in Sweden
Buildings and structures in Sundsvall Municipality
Higher education in Sundsvall